Sedum oreganum is a species of succulent plant of the genus Sedum. It grows along the Pacific Coast of North America from Alaska to far northern California. The plant, known by the common name Oregon stonecrop, grows in many types of rocky habitat, including coastal bluffs and cliffs and the talus of higher inland mountains.

References

External links

Jepson Manual Treatment
USDA Plants Profile
Washington Burke Museum
Flora of North America
Photo gallery

oreganum